Lin-7 homolog A is a protein that in humans is encoded by the LIN7A gene.

Interactions 

LIN7A has been shown to interact with:
 CASK,
 DLG1, and
 KCNJ12.

References

Further reading